Descanso may refer to:

 Descanso (roadside memorial)
 Descanso (spider), a genus of jumping spider
 Descanso, California, an unincorporated community in the United States
 Descanso, Santa Catarina, a town and municipality in Brazil
 Descanso Gardens, a botanical garden in La Cañada Flintridge, California